Oleh Shevchenko ( (born January 8, 1993) is a Ukrainian volleyball player, a member of the Ukraine men's national volleyball team and Barkom-Kazhany.

Career
Oleh Shevchenko started his professional career in Yurydychna Akademiya.

He was a member of the Ukraine men's national volleyball team in 2019 Men's European Volleyball Championship.

Sporting achievements

Clubs 
 Kazakhstan Championship:
 x1  2017/18
 Ukrainian Championship:
 x1  2018/19
 Ukrainian Cup:
 x1  2018/19
 Ukrainian Supercup:
 x2  2018/2019, 2019/2020

National Team 
 2017  European League

Individual 
 2015/2016 Best Opposite  Ukrainian Super League
 2017/2018 Best Οutside Hitter  Ukrainian Super League
 2018/2019 Best Οutside Hitter  Ukrainian Super League
 2018/2019 MVP  Ukrainian Cup

References

External links

Ukrainian men's volleyball players
VC Barkom-Kazhany players
VC Yurydychna Akademiya Kharkiv players
VC Lokomotyv Kharkiv players
1993 births
Living people
Sportspeople from Kharkiv